Ovula costellata is a species of sea snail, a marine gastropod mollusk in the family Ovulidae, the ovulids, cowry allies or false cowries.

Description

Commonly known as the Pink-Mouth Egg Shell, this relatively small snail attains a shell size of 50mm.

Distribution

Ovula costellata has a tropical to sub-tropical distribution range, from East Africa to the Western Pacific and New Zealand's Kermadec islands.

References

 Quoy, H. E. Th. & Gaimard, P., 1834 Mollusques. Zoologie. In Voyage de découvertes de l'Astrolabe, exécuté par ordre du Roi, pendant les années 1826-1827-1828-1829, sous le commandement de M. J. Dumont d'Urville, vol. 3(1), p. 1-366
 Liltved W.R. (2000) Cowries and their relatives of southern Africa. A study of the southern African cypraeacean and velutinacean gastropod fauna. Seacomber Publications. 224 pp.
 Steyn, D.G & Lussi, M. (2005). Offshore Shells of Southern Africa: A pictorial guide to more than 750 Gastropods. Published by the authors. Pp. i–vi, 1–289 page(s): 35
 Lorenz F. & Fehse D. (2009) The living Ovulidae. A manual of the families of allied cowries: Ovulidae, Pediculariidae and Eocypraeidae. Hackenheim: Conchbooks.
 Spencer, H.G., Marshall, B.A. & Willan, R.C. (2009). Checklist of New Zealand living Mollusca. Pp 196-219. in: Gordon, D.P. (ed.) New Zealand inventory of biodiversity. Volume one. Kingdom Animalia: Radiata, Lophotrochozoa, Deuterostomia. Canterbury University Press, Christchurch.

External links
 Lamarck [J.B.M.de. (1810). Sur la détermination des espèces parmi les animaux sans vertèbres, et particulièrement parmi les Mollusques testacés. Annales du Muséum d'Histoire Naturelle. 15: 20-40]
 Deshayes, G. P. & Milne-Edwards, H. (1844). Histoire naturelle des animaux sans vertèbres, présentant les caractères généraux et particuliers de ces animaux, leur distribution, leurs classes, leurs familles, leurs genres, et la citation des principales espèces qui s'y rapportent, par J. B. P. A. de Lamarck. Deuxième édition, Tome dixième. Histoire des Mollusques. J. B. Baillière: Paris. 638 pp
 Lamarck, [J.-B. M. de. (1822). Histoire naturelle des animaux sans vertèbres. Tome septième. Paris: published by the Author, 711 pp]

Ovulidae
Gastropods described in 1810